WWJ may refer to:

In broadcasting, the following stations in Detroit, Michigan, United States
Current stations
WWJ (AM), a radio station (950 AM) with an all-news format owned by Audacy
WWJ-TV, a CBS owned and operated television station (channel 21, virtual 62)

Stations formerly known as WWJ
WXYT-FM, a radio station (97.1 FM) that was known as WWJ-FM from 1948 to 1981
WDIV-TV, an NBC affiliated television station (channel 4 virtual/32 physical) that was known as WWJ-TV from 1947 to 1978

Other
Wireless Watch Japan
Water Well Journal
World Wind Java release